Futbolo klubas Neptūnas, commonly known as Neptūnas is a Lithuanian football team from the port city of Klaipėda.

History
Club was established in 2020. In January 2020 it was officially announced that Basketball Club Neptūnas aims to have a football team. The team successfully licensed and debuted in the II Lyga. With the help of 5-6 professional footballers, wished to win the II Lyga and to be promoted to the I Lyga. Prerequisites for assembling a football team emerged after 2019 another club from Klaipėda FK Atlantas, who was eliminated from A Lyga and later (after season of 2020) defunct.

2021 the team received a license of the I Lyga and participated in the I Lyga championship. In the final line-up the team was remained in tenth place out of fourteen participants.

In December 2021 it was announced that Valdas Trakys become the new head coach.

Honours

Domestic
 Antra lyga:
 Runner-up: 2020

Recent seasons

Kit evolution 
 2021 – Jako (kit manufacturer)

Colors 
 2020 – now.

Squad
 

|-----
! colspan="9" bgcolor="#B0D3FB" align="left" |
|----- bgcolor="#DFEDFD"

|-----
! colspan="9" bgcolor="#B0D3FB" align="left" |
|----- bgcolor="#DFEDFD"

|-----
! colspan="9" bgcolor="#B0D3FB" align="left" |
|----- bgcolor="#DFEDFD"

Notable and famous players
FK Neptūnas players who have either appeared for their respective national team at any time or received an individual award while at the club.
Lithuania
 Marius Papšys

Managers
  Donatas Navikas (January 2020 – April 2020) 
  Kęstutis Ivaškevičius (April 2020 – December 2021)
  Valdas Trakys (December 2021 –)

References

External links
 Official site
 Facebook: FK Neptūnas
 lietuvosfutbolas.lt (2020 m. Antra lyga; final stage)
 lietuvosfutbolas.lt (2021 m. Pirma lyga)
 SOCCERWAY (2021 m. Pirma lyga)

Football clubs in Lithuania
Football clubs in Klaipėda
2020 establishments in Lithuania
Association football clubs established in 2020